Death Force (also known as Vengeance Is Mine) is a 1978 martial arts exploitation film directed by Cirio H. Santiago and written by Howard R. Cohen. The film is an international co-production of the Philippines and the United States, and stars blaxploitation actor James Iglehart alongside Carmen Argenziano, Leon Isaac Kennedy, and Jayne Kennedy. Iglehart plays Doug Russell, a veteran of the Vietnam War turned gold smuggler who is left for dead by his partners and, after being trained to wield a samurai sword by a Japanese soldier, seeks revenge on those who betrayed him. Iglehart's real son, James Monroe Iglehart appears briefly as Jimmy Russell, Doug's infant son.

Cast
 James Iglehart as Doug Russell
 Carmen Argenziano as Morelli
 Leon Isaac Kennedy as McGee
 Jayne Kennedy as Maria Russell
 Jose Mari Avellana
 Joonee Gamboa
 James Monroe Iglehart as Jimmy Russell
 Armando Federico as Rico
 Darnell Garcia as Hitman
 Vic Diaz as Chinaman

Premise
American soldiers Doug Russell (James Iglehart), McGee (Leon Isaac Kennedy) and Morelli (Carmen Argenziano) serving in Vietnam are selling gold bars on the black market. Upon their arrival stateside Morelli convinces McGee to betray Russell. Believing that they killed Russell, Morelli and McGee begin taking over the criminal underworld in Los Angeles. Meanwhile, Russell washes up on a beach of a Pacific Island. There he is discovered by two surviving Japanese soldiers who have been on the Island since before World War II. The senior officer decides to teach Russell the ways of Samurai sword fighting. After healing up and learning all the knowledge to defeat his enemies Russell heads to Los Angeles. He finds his family is gone and his enemies are now in charge of all crime in the city. Russell begins dismantling Morelli and McGee's crime syndicate one member at a time. Once Russell exacts revenge against Morelli and McGee he is reunited with his wife Maria (Jayne Kennedy) and son Jimmy (James Monroe Iglehart).

Home media
In September 2013, Death Force was released on DVD by Vinegar Syndrome as a double feature with the 1978 film Vampire Hookers, which was also directed by Santiago. In June 2014, Death Force was released on DVD and Blu-ray in Germany by Subkultur Entertainment.

References

External links
 

1978 action films
1978 films
1978 martial arts films
1970s exploitation films
American action films
American martial arts films
American exploitation films
Films about Filipino Americans
Philippine action films
Philippine martial arts films
1970s English-language films
Films directed by Cirio H. Santiago
1970s American films